Garraveh-ye Nomareh Do (also Romanized as Garrāveh-ye Nomareh Do; also known as Garrāveh-ye Do) is a village in Nasrabad Rural District (Kermanshah Province), in the Central District of Qasr-e Shirin County, Kermanshah Province, Iran. At the 2006 census, its population was 19, in 6 families. The village is populated by Kurds.

References 

Populated places in Qasr-e Shirin County
Kurdish settlements in Kermanshah Province